The people on this list are or were survivors of Nazi Germany's attempt to exterminate the Jewish people in Europe before and during World War II. A state-enforced persecution of Jewish people in Nazi-controlled Europe lasted from the introduction of the Nuremberg Laws in 1935 to Hitler's defeat in 1945. Although there were many victims of the Holocaust, the International Commission on Holocaust Era Insurance Claims (ICHEIC) defines a Holocaust survivor as, "Any Jew who lived for any period of time in a country that was ruled by the Nazis or their allies."
The United States Holocaust Memorial Museum (USHMM) gives a broader definition: "The Museum honors as a survivor any person who was displaced, persecuted, and/or discriminated against by the racial, religious, ethnic, social, and/or political policies of the Nazis and their allies between 1933 and 1945. In addition to former inmates of concentration camps and ghettos, this includes refugees and people in hiding." Most notably, as well as Jewish people, this includes Poles, Romani people, Jehovah's Witnesses and those who were persecuted for political reasons such as Communists, those who were persecuted for religious reasons (such as Pastor Niemoller), and homosexuals and those of other sexual orientations. It includes those who were actually in hiding in Nazi-occupied countries. The latter includes Hidden Children, who were hidden to escape the Nazis.

Most especially, in contrast to the ICHEIC definition, it includes refugees, who fled from their homeland to escape the Nazis, and never lived in a Nazi-controlled country.

The ICHEIC definition was created for the purpose of resolving some insurance claims. Over time, the classes of insurance claims have greatly expanded.

This list does not include refugees, since it is created on the basis of the restricted ICHEIC definition. Refugees include the unaccompanied children of the Kindertransport and the unaccompanied One Thousand Children.

Actors, actresses and directors

Living

Deceased

Artists, painters, and photographers

Living

Deceased

Humanities

Living

Deceased

Literature, memoirs and publishing

Living

Deceased

Mathematics and natural sciences

Living

Deceased

Military

Deceased

Music

Living

Deceased

Politics, resistance

Living

Deceased

Speakers and researchers of the Holocaust

Living

Deceased

Sports

Living

Deceased

Theology, spirituality, religion

Living

Deceased

Other

Living

Deceased

See also
 3GNY
 American Gathering of Jewish Holocaust Survivors and their Descendants
 List of survivors of Sobibor
 List of victims and survivors of Auschwitz
 Holocaust denial
 Jews escaping from Nazi Europe
 List of victims of Nazism
 Selvino children
 Sh'erit ha-Pletah
 Heroic Children, a collection of true stories about child survivors

Documentaries about Holocaust survivors
 The Boys of Buchenwald
 The Girl From Boryslaw: Australian Story with Sabina Wolanski, the story of Sabina Wolanski who was chosen to speak on behalf of the six million dead at the opening of the Memorial to the Murdered Jews of Europe in Berlin in May 2005
 The Lady in Number 6
 Marion's Triumph
 One Survivor Remembers, directed by Kary Antholis
 Pola's March
 Shoah, directed by Claude Lanzmann

References

External links
 Online Torchlighter Film Archive - an archive of the short films depicting the stories of the survivors shown as each of six torches is lit during the official Yom HaShoah ceremony that takes place at Yad Vashem
 United States Holocaust Memorial Museum

Aftermath of the Holocaust
 
Lists of survivors
 
Survivors